Pétur Rúnar Birgisson (born February 20, 1996) is an Icelandic basketball player who plays for Tindastóll of the Úrvalsdeild karla.

Career

Club career
Pétur had a stellar 2014-2015 season and helped Tindastóll to the 2015 Úrvalsdeild finals after averaging 7.8 assists in the semi-finals against Haukar. In the finals, Tindastóll lost to KR 3-1.

His stellar play continued in 2015-2016. He averaged 13.5 points and 6.0 assists in Tindastóls 3-1 victory against Keflavík in the first round of the playoffs. He was however unable to prevent Tindastóll from losing to Haukar in the semi-finals, 3-1.

On January 13, 2018, he helped Tindastóll to its first major title when they beat KR in Icelandic Basketball Cup finals. In the game he had 22 points, 8 assists and 7 rebounds, and was named as the Cup finals MVP.

On May 4, 2018, Pétur was named to the Úrvalsdeild Karla Domestic All-First Team. On 30 September, he won the Icelandic Super Cup after Tindastóll beat KR, 103-72.

Icelandic national team
In May 2017, Pétur was named to the Icelandic national team for the 2017 Games of the Small States of Europe where he helped Iceland finish third.
In July 2017, he was among the 24 players selected for the national team training camp prior to EuroBasket 2017. He was not named to the twelve man roster for Eurobasket. As of 2018 he has played five games for the national team.

Awards, titles and accomplishments

Individual awards
Úrvalsdeild Karla Domestic All-First Team: 2018
Icelandic Cup MVP: 2018
Úrvalsdeild Karla Young Player of the Year: 2015

Titles
Icelandic Basketball Cup: 2018
Icelandic Super Cup: 2018
Icelandic Company Cup: 2012
Icelandic D1: 2014

References

External links
 Icelandic statistics at kki.is
 Profile at realgm.com

1996 births
Living people
Petur Runar Birgisson
Petur Runar Birgisson
Point guards
Petur Runar Birgisson